The Magical Adventures of Quasimodo is an animated television series based on Victor Hugo's 1831 novel Notre Dame de Paris.

The show was produced by Ares Films, CinéGroupe, Télé-Images, and Astral Media. It aired in 1996.

The series takes place in Paris, 1483. The three main characters are Quasimodo, Esmeralda, and François. They fight villains, stop sinister plots, and escape from traps. They often come face to face with their greatest enemy, Frollo.

In 2006, BCI with Hearst Entertainment, released 2 episodes on DVD within their “Advantage Cartoon Mega Pack”. In 2009, Mill Creek Entertainment released a complete set containing all 26 episodes of the series.

Characters

Main Cast 
Quasimodo (Jacques de Bernasack): A 16-year-old hunchback, the title character of the series.
Esmeralda: A beautiful young Romani dancer.
François: Esmeralda's brother, the poet.
Djali: Esmeralda's pet goat.
Arabelle: a horse.
Claude Frollo: The main villain of the series, and Quasimodo's former master. A demonic magician in his own right, he plots to kill the King Louis XI of France.
Azarof: Frollo's loyal dog.
Dennis: The alchemist, a friend of Quasimodo and the King.
Angelica: Esmeralda and François' adopted grandmother.

Secondary and episodic characters 

 King Louis XI: The elderly ruler of France.
Charles and Vivianne de Bernasack: powerful alchemists and Quasimodo's parents.
Maria Villon: Quasimodo's former nanny.
Leonardo da Vinci: A young genius, engineer and artist.
Mildred: Leonardo's carrier pigeon.
Manolo: A Romani baron, Angelica's old friend.
Vernier: The constable.
Margarita: the orphanage teacher.
Fox: a highwayman, “the man of a thousand faces”.
Bobo, Alfons and Loran: Rasperin's errand boys.
Ferdinand: Angelica's brother and Esmeralda's godfather.
Carlos: Ferdinand's son.
Roger: An architect.
Andrews: A sculptor and former thief.
Gaspar: a one-eyed friend of Angelica.
Gustavo: a boatman.
Lucile and Robert la Fleur: Children of late Mark and Mirelle la Fleur, who were good friends of Quasimodo's parents.
Isabelle: The High Priestess of the Council of Magicians.
The Abomination (Robert la Fete): the lizard man and magician, Frollo's ex-assistant.

Villains 
Raoul Fortin: A criminal, hired by Frollo to assassinate the King.
Jester: A buffoon and thief.
Oracle: Frollo's former partner.
Camille Eon: A powerful magician, Frollo's old acquaintance.
Armand, Pierre, Jean-Luke and Marcel: thieves from the Court of Miracles.
Biddle: Maria's former employer.
Larus: the cruel tax collector.
Rasperin: A corrupt owner of the Half-Moon Inn.
Baron Guillaume: a tyrannical owner of the Valley of the Auvergne.
Gilbere: Guillaume's right-hand man.
Lorlof: Frollo's alter-ego.
Clopin:
Casimir: The evil cousin of Romani king, who wants to take his place.

Episodes

Cast
The actors and actresses, who did the voices for the show, are:

Sonja Ball – Various
Daniel Brochu – Quasimodo
Mark Camacho – Various
Richard Dumont – Various
Susan Glover – Various
A. J. Henderson – Dennis
Harry Hill – Various
Arthur Holden – Various
Rick Jones 
Pauline Little – Various
Bronwen Mantel
Anik Matern
Eleanor Noble – Esmeralda
Michael O'Reilly – Casimir
Terrence Scammell – François/Azarof
Vlasta Vrána – Frollo

External links
 
 The magical adventures of Quasimodo at WorldCat

1990s Canadian animated television series
1996 Canadian television series debuts
1996 Canadian television series endings
1990s French animated television series
1996 French television series debuts
1996 French television series endings
Canadian children's animated action television series
Canadian children's animated adventure television series
Canadian children's animated fantasy television series
CBC Television original programming
Family Channel (Canadian TV network) original programming
French children's animated action television series
French children's animated adventure television series
French children's animated fantasy television series
Seven Network original programming
BBC children's television shows
TVNZ 2 original programming
RTÉ original programming
SABC 1 original programming